Life preserver or life-preserver may refer to:

Personal flotation device, is a piece of equipment designed to assist a wearer in keeping afloat; also referred to as a lifejacket, life preserver, Mae West, life vest, life saver, cork jacket, buoyancy aid, or flotation suit
Lifebuoy, a ring-shaped flotation device
A kind of club